Łukasz Bejger (born 11 January 2002) is a Polish professional footballer who plays as a centre-back for Śląsk Wrocław.

Club career

Manchester United
Bejger joined Lech Poznań from hometown team KS Piłkarz - a club set up in part by his father - in 2015. On 31 July 2018, the centre-back completed a transfer to Premier League side Manchester United. He made six total appearances for the U18s across the 2018–19 season, as well as featuring once in the UEFA Youth League for the U19s; in a 2–1 away win against Valencia on 12 December. Bejger spent the next season with the U18s, appearing twelve times, before moving up with the U23s in 2020–21. Five appearances followed, while he also featured in the EFL Trophy for the U21s; in a 4–0 away loss to Morecambe on 18 November 2020. He had signed a professional contract when he turned seventeen.

Śląsk Wrocław
On 23 January 2021, Bejger departed Manchester United in order to return to his homeland with Śląsk Wrocław; stating the intention "to obtain experience of senior football", as he penned a four-and-a-half-year contract. He made his senior debut in a Ekstraklasa home match with Pogoń Szczecin on 28 February, featuring for the full duration of a 2–1 victory.

International career
Bejger represented Poland at U16, U17 and U19 level. Having played thirteen times for the U16s across 2017–18, Bejger moved up to the U17s during 2018–19 under manager Przemysław Małecki; soon appearing in six qualifiers for the 2019 UEFA European Under-17 Championship. In November 2019, Bejger made three appearances for the U19s in qualifying for the eventually cancelled 2020 UEFA European Under-19 Championship. March 2021 saw a call-up to the U21s for friendlies with Saudi Arabia U20 and Austria U21 in San Pedro del Pinatar, Spain.

Style of play
Bejger is primarily a centre-back, though is capable of playing at right-back; having played there whilst with Manchester United's academy as well as with the Poland U19s.

Career statistics
.

References

External links

2002 births
Living people
People from Golub-Dobrzyń
Polish footballers
Poland youth international footballers
Poland under-21 international footballers
Association football defenders
Ekstraklasa players
II liga players
Śląsk Wrocław players
Polish expatriate footballers
Expatriate footballers in England
Polish expatriate sportspeople in England